Stade du Kef is a multi-use stadium in El Kef, Tunisia. It is the home ground of Olympique du Kef, and it has the capacity of 9,000.

Kef